Jiella aquimaris is a Gram-negative, strictly aerobic, rod-shaped and motile from the genus of Jiella which has been isolated from seawater from the East China Sea.

References

External links
Type strain of Jiella aquimaris at BacDive -  the Bacterial Diversity Metadatabase

Hyphomicrobiales
Bacteria described in 2015